The A-Rosa Viva is a German river cruise ship, cruising in the Rhine – Main – Moselle basin. The ship was built by Neptun Werft GmbH at their shipyard in Warnemünde, Germany, and entered service in March 2010.  Her sister ships are A-Rosa Aqua and A-Rosa Brava. Her home port is currently Rostock.

Features
The ship has two restaurants, lounge  and two bars, Finnish sauna and resting area.

See also
 List of river cruise ships

References

External links

2010 ships
River cruise ships